Digital News was a trade publication that focused on products from Digital Equipment Corporation (DEC).

History
They published independently from 1986 thru 1992. At that point, they were acquired and merged with Digital Review with the new title Digital News & Review. DEC product news and reviews from Sonny Monosson, which were featured on the Digital Business pages of Digital News were retained in the pages of Digital News & Reviews.

The Boston Globe had described the situation between the prior publication owners as "The war among the Digitals: Bitter competition reflects growing rivalry between Ziff, McGovern empires."  The combined Digital News & Review periodical was printed from 1992 to 1996 by Reed Business Information.

Hardcopy (magazine)
In 1988, Digital News acquired 1980-founded  Hardcopy magazine (stylized HARDCOPY). At the time, International Data Group Ziff Davis published "a third DEC-users journal, Boston-based Digital Review."  was the fourth player.

References

Defunct mass media companies of the United States
Defunct newspaper companies of the United States